Brahm Prakash (21 August 1912 – 3 January 1984), was a metallurgist known for his work with nuclear materials in India.

Biography
Born  in Lahore (now in Pakistan), Brahm Prakash had his college education in chemistry, and pursued his doctoral research in physical metallurgy at the Punjab University (1942). For his post-doctoral work, he was associated with the Indian scientist Shanti Swarup Bhatnagar. He worked as an Asst. Metallurgist from 1940-45.

Prakash had advanced academic training in the United States in 1946, soon after the end of World War II. At Massachusetts Institute of Technology, he had joined the Department of Metallurgy. He completed his second PhD programme under the influence of John Chipman, Morris Cohen, A.M. Gaudin, and Reinhardt Schumann (Jr.), qualifying for his Sc.D.(MIT), specialising in the disciplines of Mineral Engineering and Metallurgical Thermodynamics.

When Prakash returned to India,  he obtained a position in the Atomic Energy programme, in Bombay, working as a metallurgist from 1948 to 1950.

Career

Towards the end of 1950, Prakash took up the Headship of the Department of Metallurgy at the Indian Institute of Science (IISc). At the time the setting up of Atomic Energy Commission's metallurgy laboratories was in the very early stage. It was planned that he would return to Bombay, as soon as the programme of work picked up its momentum there.

When he took charge in January 1951, the Department was still in the early days of its growth, and the laboratory facilities were limited. The stay at MIT (1946–49) had given him experience in formulating a comprehensive course curriculum in Metallurgy. During the six years of his leadership, there was a steady expansion in the volume and variety of research programmes, including externally sponsored and funded projects, in the Department.

Research

Along with his academic responsibilities in Bangalore, Prakash undertook sponsored research for the Indian Atomic Energy programme. This included separation of zirconium and hafnium, metallurgy of nuclear grade zirconium.

In 1955, he was selected for a prestigious assignment as one of the scientific secretaries for the first United Nations conference on the peaceful uses of Atomic Energy (that was held in Geneva in 1955). Stationed in New York, he carried out preparatory work for the conference.

Results on vapour phase dechlorination of zirconium presented by Brahm Prakash at the conference was acclaimed for its originality. The results on selective reduction of zirconium chloride were presented in the next Geneva Conference held in 1958. The achievements in the zirconium programme in Bangalore truly laid the foundation for the larger programme subsequently undertaken in Bombay and setting up of Nuclear Fuel Complex (NFC) in Hyderabad, in 1971.  As Project Director, Brahm Prakash helped set up facilities for large scale production of zirconium sponge, zirconium mill products, and zircaloy clad ceramic uranium oxide fuel elements.

By early 1957, Brahm Prakash was recalled to Bombay. He served the Department of Atomic Energy with distinction from 1957 to 1972.

Space development

From 1972 to 1979 worked with the Indian Space Research Organisation (ISRO). He joined as the first Director of the Vikram Sarabhai Space Centre (VSSC) in Tiruvananthapuram, in May 1972.

He provided harmonious leadership and contributed to success of satellite and launch vehicle programmes. He continued as a Member of the Space Commission till his demise in 1984.  Today the Indian Space research programme is recognised as one of the most successful programmes in the world.

Prakash was instrumental in taking a far-sighted decision to go for new generation Maraging Steel against 15 CDV-6 for construction of rocket motor casings for satellite launch vehicles. Indigenously produced Maraging steel 250 has been performing flawlessly and has emerged as a workhorse material for all Polar Satellite Launch Vehicle (PSLV) and Geosynchronous Satellite Launch Vehicle (GSLV) used thus far.

Special metals and alloys development
It was on his recommendation that Government of India sanctioned setting up of a special metals and alloys project by Mishra Dhatu Nigam Limited (acronym MIDHANI) at Hyderabad. A wide range of superalloys, titanium and titanium alloys, special steels including maraging steel for satellite launch vehicles,  and other are manufactured at this facility. Brahm Prakash was Chairman of the Company from 7 April 1980 right up to the time of his demise (24 January 1984).

Awards
India's fourth highest civilian honour 'Padma Shri' was bestowed on him in 1961. Two years later, he received the Shanti Swarup Bhatnagar Prize for engineering sciences in 1963. This was followed by award of 'Padma Bhushan', the third highest civilian honour to him in 1968.

References

External links 
http://materials.iisc.ernet.in/~www/archives/people/brahm.html
https://web.archive.org/web/20130709005545/http://materials.iisc.ernet.in/~www/awards/bpvc.html
https://web.archive.org/web/20130925043649/http://gcesalem.edu.in/profbrahm-prakash-memorial-metals-and-materials-quiz13
http://www.newindiadigest.com/kalam2.htm

1912 births
1984 deaths
Indian metallurgists
Massachusetts Institute of Technology alumni
Recipients of the Padma Shri in science & engineering
Recipients of the Padma Bhushan in science & engineering
Fellows of the Indian National Science Academy
Academic staff of the Indian Institute of Science
20th-century Indian engineers
People from Lahore
Recipients of the Shanti Swarup Bhatnagar Award in Engineering Science